Saint Andrew South Western is a parliamentary constituency represented in the House of Representatives of the Jamaican Parliament. It elects one Member of Parliament MP by the first past the post system of election. The constituency was created in 1959. It is currently represented by the Dr Angela Brown-Burke of the PNP.

Since the mid 1970s Saint Andrew South Western has been an extremely safe seat for the People's National Party, which has won it by overwhelming margins in every election since except for the PNP-boycotted 1983 election.

Boundaries 

The constituency includes Payne Land and Whitfield in Saint Andrew Parish.

Members of Parliament

Elections

References

Parliamentary constituencies of Jamaica